The Years of Exile is a 2002 film directed by Nabyl Lahlou. Adapted from the novel Une enquête au pays by Driss Chraîbi, this film shows the resistance of Berber villagers in the High Atlas against the representatives of the Moroccan administration in the 1960s.

Synopsis 
Mohammed, a police chief, and his deputy inspector Ali are looking for a criminal who has taken refuge in a remote Berber village. They land at the home of the Aït Yafelmane family and will eventually set the village on fire.

Cast 

 Nabyl Lahlou
 Sophia Hadi
 Younes Megri
 Mohamed Belfkih
 Amal Ayouch
 Mahjoub Raji
 Mehdi Piro

References 

2002 films
Moroccan drama films
2000s Arabic-language films
Films directed by Nabyl Lahlou